Dante's is a nightclub and live music venue in Portland, Oregon. The venue, located along West Burnside Street and owned by Frank Faillace, hosts a variety of acts ranging from burlesque to rock music.

Dante's is housed in an unreinforced masonry building.

History

Faillace opened Dante's in early 2000. In 2017, Pizza Slut replaced the bar's Lonesome's Pizza. Lonesome's had been ranked number seven in The Oregonian 2013 list of "Portland's top 10 pizzas by the slice".

Doug Stanhope's Beer Hall Putsch standup album was recorded at Dante's in 2013. Katt Williams performed at the venue in 2018.

American Society of Composers, Authors and Publishers took Dante's to court in November 2018 for copyright infringement for unauthorized public performance of ASCAP members' creative work. According to ASCAP, it has made numerous attempts to contact the venue prior to legal actions.

Reception
Dante's was a runner-up in the "Best Music Venue" category of Willamette Week "Best of Portland Readers' Poll 2020".

References

External links 

 
 

 

2000 establishments in Oregon
Event venues in Oregon
Music venues in Portland, Oregon
Nightclubs in Portland, Oregon
Southwest Portland, Oregon